SAKO, Limited (lit "Civil Guard Gun and Machining Works Ltd") is a Finnish firearm and ammunition manufacturer located in Riihimäki, Tavastia Proper in southern Finland.  It also has owned the Tikka brand of bolt-action rifles since 1983, and is now owned by the Italian firearm holding company Beretta Holding.

History
In 1919, two years after Finland declared independence from the Russian Empire, the Suojeluskuntain Yliesikunnan Asepaja (Civil Guard Supreme Staff Gun Works) opened in a former Helsinki brewery to repair private arms and recondition Russian military rifles for Finnish service. The rifle repair shop became financially independent of the civil guard in 1921. The Suojeluskuntain Yliesikunnan Asepaja moved from Helsinki to an ammunition factory in Riihimäki on 1 June 1927, and reorganized as SAKO in the 1930s. Sako started exporting pistol cartridges to Sweden in the 1930s and continued manufacturing submachine gun cartridges through World War II.

Another Finnish firearms manufacturer Tikkakoski, which owned the Tikka brand, was merged into SAKO in 1983. In 1986, the arms manufacturing division of the government-owned Valmet conglomerate (which itself had been derived from the Valtion Kivääritehdas, VKT) was merged with Sako and called Sako-Valmet, with ownership split evenly between Nokia and Valmet. After further organizational shifts in state ownership, the company was sold to the Italian Beretta Holding in 2000.

Post–World War II production
The first civilian rifle bearing the Sako name was the L42 (Luodikko [rifle] model 1942) chambered for the 7×33mm Sako cartridge, prototyped in 1942, and commercial production started after World War II. Sako developed the 7×33mm cartridge based on the 9×19mm Parabellum pistol cartridge, by making a longer case and "necking" the case down to 7 mm calibre (7.21 mm bullet diameter). This cartridge was designed for and well suited to capercaillie and black grouse hunting, a popular sport in Finland, Sweden and Norway. The L46 was later denoted L461 "Vixen". The L461 has been very popular in Finland and Sweden, especially chambered for the .222 Remington cartridge and has a great reputation among aficionados.

In 1957, Sako launched a longer action, the L57, subsequently renamed L579 "Forester". This is a "medium action" intended for the .308 Winchester and similar cartridges.

In 1961, Sako introduced the L61R "Finnbear" for long cartridges like the .30-06 and 6.5×55mm.

Between 1959 and 1974, Sako produced a lever-action gun, the Sako Finnwolf, in  .243 Winchester and .308 Winchester.

Sako has also produced a number of rimfire rifles, among them are the P72 Finnscout, M78, Finnfire, Quad and Finnfire II. The M78 was also chambered for the .22 Hornet and the .22 WMR in addition to the .22 Long Rifle.

During the 1980s (1987), Sako started using the AI/AII/AV designations (previously used for models imported to the US) for the three action lengths in Europe. The complete rifles were still designated L461/L579/L61. The bolt was given a slight cosmetic makeover, with the hammer covered by a conical shell. This visual design was also used on the later models (M4/5/691, M75, M85).

The L579 could be delivered with detachable magazine although the default was a hinged floorplate.

From 1987 to 1992 a version of the short (Vixen) action was produced for the .22 PPC and 6mm PPC cartridges, when Sako introduced these former wildcat cartridges as commercial cartridges, denoted ".22 PPC USA" and "6mm PPC USA" to avoid confusion with the specialized bench rest cartridges which required a "tight neck" chamber. These actions are the same external dimensions, and have the same bolt diameter as the 222 Remington, 222 Rem. Magnum, 223 Rem. cartridge actions. Only the bolt face recess was enlarged to suit the PPC case.

In 1992, the first of the "newer" Sakos, the 591, was introduced as a replacement for the L579. Shortly after, the 491 and the 691 were launched. These rifles (491/591/691) are not as highly regarded as the L461/L579/L61R and according to folklore, the quality of the workmanship is slightly inferior for the 491/591/691. They featured a separate recoil lug, also found on the 75, and a Tikka trigger assembly. However, these rifles were available in left-hand configuration both as a medium action (591) and long action (691)

In 1997, Sako launched the 75, named for Sako's 75th anniversary. The 75 was externally similar to previous Sako models, but the construction was radically different featuring three symmetrical locking lugs and a detachable magazine.

Before the 75, Sako hunting rifles (except the L46 and the L579) did not have detachable magazines, but a hinged floorplate with the lock placed on the front of the trigger guard.

Sako's latest (and current) model, the M85, was introduced in 2006. In 2020, S20 was released.

Current production

Sako brand
 Sako S20 — A modular "hybrid" rifle with aluminium bedding chassis and interchangeable furnitures (buttstock/grip and fore-end)
 Sako 85 — Sako's premium-line bolt-action centerfire hunting rifle, available in many configurations and calibres from .204 Ruger through to .416 RM
 Sako A7 — Sako's mid-price-range hunting rifle, filling the gap between the Sako 85 premium line and the Tikka T3x value line hunting rifles. The A7 combines different features from the Sako 85 and the Tikka T3, along with a unique in-line detachable magazine design, and is currently (2010) available only with a synthetic stock, in combination with either a blued chromoly or stainless steel barrelled action.
 Sako TRG — A long-range sniper rifle geared toward law enforcement and military use
 Sako Quad — A rimfire rifle, available in a variety of configurations with interchangeable barrels in .17 HMR, .17 HM2, .22 LR and .22 WMR calibres
 Sako Finnfire II — A rimfire rifle available in .17 HMR and .22 LR calibres

Tikka brand
 Tikka T3x — Sako's budget-range centerfire hunting rifle, available in calibres from .204 Ruger to .338 WM
 Tikka T1x MTR — A "multi-task rimfire" rifle with the same receiver footprint as the T3x, introduced in 2018, available in .17 HMR and .22 LR calibres

Sako model history (Europe)

Models

In popular culture
The anime series Upotte!!, in its moe anthropomorphism, depicts Sako, the rifle/girl as a gleeful and homicidal sexual sadist.

References

External links

 SAKO corporate website
 SAKO USA division
 TIKKA brand website
 TIKKA brand Canadian mirror
 Sako A7 website
 Modern Firearms
 Gunwriters' M95 Assault Rifle
 50 Years of Sako

Beretta
Firearm manufacturers of Finland
Defence companies of Finland
1921 establishments in Finland